The North Carolina Central Lady Eagles basketball team is the basketball team that represents North Carolina Central University, which is located in Durham, North Carolina. The team currently competes in the Mid-Eastern Athletic Conference.

Postseason

NCAA Division II tournament results
The Lady Eagles made five appearances in the NCAA Division II women's basketball tournament. They had a combined record of 5–5.

References

External links